Ṅa is the fifth consonant of Indic abugidas. In modern Indic scripts, It is derived from the early "Ashoka" Brahmi letter  after having gone through the Gupta letter .

Āryabhaṭa numeration

Aryabhata used Devanagari letters for numbers, very similar to the Greek numerals, even after the invention of Indian numerals.
The values of the different forms of ङ are: 
ङ  = 5 (५)
ङि  = 500 (५००)
ङु  = 50,000 (५० ०००)
ङृ  = 5,000,000 (५० ०० ०००)
ङॢ  = 5 (५०८)
ङे  = 5 (५०१०)
ङै  = 5 (५०१२)
ङो  = 5 (५०१४)
ङौ  = 5 (५०१६)

Historic Nga
There are three different general early historic scripts - Brahmi and its variants, Kharoṣṭhī, and Tocharian, the so-called slanting Brahmi. Nga as found in standard Brahmi,  was a simple geometric shape, with variations toward more flowing forms by the Gupta . The Tocharian Nga  did not have an alternate Fremdzeichen form. Unlike the other early Brahmic scripts, Kharoṣṭhī did not have a letter Nga.

Brahmi Nga
The Brahmi letter , Nga, is probably derived from the altered Aramaic Nun , and is thus related to the modern Latin N and Greek Nu (letter). Several identifiable styles of writing the Brahmi Nga can be found, most associated with a specific set of inscriptions from an artifact or diverse records from an historic period. As the earliest and most geometric style of Brahmi, the letters found on the Edicts of Ashoka and other records from around that time are normally the reference form for Brahmi letters, with vowel marks not attested until later forms of Brahmi back-formed to match the geometric writing style.

Tocharian Nga
The Tocharian letter  is derived from the Brahmi , but does not have an alternate Fremdzeichen form.

Devanagari script

Ṅa (ङ) is the fifth consonant of the Devanagari abugida. It ultimately arose from the Brahmi letter , after having gone through the Gupta letter . Letters that derive from it are the Gujarati letter ઙ and the Modi letter 𑘒.

Devanagari-using Languages
Like all Indic scripts, Devanagari uses vowel marks attached to the base consonant to override the inherent /ə/ vowel:

Conjuncts with ङ
Devanagari exhibits conjunct ligatures, as is common in Indic scripts. In modern Devanagari texts, most conjuncts are formed by reducing the letter shape to fit tightly to the following letter, usually by dropping a character's vertical stem, sometimes referred to as a "half form". Some conjunct clusters are always represented by a true ligature, instead of a shape that can be broken into constituent independent letters. Vertically stacked conjuncts are ubiquitous in older texts, while only a few are still used routinely in modern Devanagari texts. Lacking a vertical stem to drop for making a half form, Ṅa either forms a stacked conjunct/ligature, or uses its full form with Virama. The use of ligatures and vertical conjuncts may vary across languages using the Devanagari script, with Marathi in particular avoiding their use where texts in other languages would use them.

Ligature conjuncts of ङ
True ligatures are quite rare in Indic scripts. The most common ligated conjuncts in Devanagari are in the form of a slight mutation to fit in context or as a consistent variant form appended to the adjacent characters. Those variants include Na and the Repha and Rakar forms of Ra. Nepali and Marathi texts use the "eyelash" Ra half form  for an initial "R" instead of repha.
 Repha र্ (r) + ङ (ŋa) gives the ligature rŋa: 

 Eyelash र্ (r) + ङ (ŋa) gives the ligature rŋa:

 ङ্ (ŋ) + rakar र (ra) gives the ligature ŋra:

 ङ্ (ŋ) + य (ya) gives the ligature ŋya:

Stacked conjuncts of ङ
Vertically stacked ligatures are the most common conjunct forms found in Devanagari text. Although the constituent characters may need to be stretched and moved slightly in order to stack neatly, stacked conjuncts can be broken down into recognizable base letters, or a letter and an otherwise standard ligature.
 भ্ (bʰ) + ङ (ŋa) gives the ligature bʰŋa:

 ब্ (b) + ङ (ŋa) gives the ligature bŋa:

 छ্ (cʰ) + ङ (ŋa) gives the ligature cʰŋa:

 च্ (c) + ङ (ŋa) gives the ligature cŋa:

 ढ্ (ḍʱ) + ङ (ŋa) gives the ligature ḍʱŋa:

 ड্ (ḍ) + ङ (ŋa) gives the ligature ḍŋa:

 ध্ (dʱ) + ङ (ŋa) gives the ligature dʱŋa:

 द্ (d) + ङ (ŋa) gives the ligature dŋa:

 घ্ (ɡʱ) + ङ (ŋa) gives the ligature ɡʱŋa:

 झ্ (jʰ) + ङ (ŋa) gives the ligature jʰŋa:

 ज্ (j) + ङ (ŋa) gives the ligature jŋa:

 ख্ (kʰ) + ङ (ŋa) gives the ligature kʰŋa:

 क্ (k) + ङ (ŋa) gives the ligature kŋa:

 ळ্ (ḷ) + ङ (ŋa) gives the ligature ḷŋa:

 म্ (m) + ङ (ŋa) gives the ligature mŋa:

 ङ্ (ŋ) + ब (ba) gives the ligature ŋba:

 ङ্ (ŋ) + भ (bʰa) gives the ligature ŋbʰa:

 ङ্ (ŋ) + च (ca) gives the ligature ŋca:

 ङ্ (ŋ) + छ (cʰa) gives the ligature ŋcʰa:

 ङ্ (ŋ) + द (da) gives the ligature ŋda:

 ङ্ (ŋ) + ड (ḍa) gives the ligature ŋḍa:

 ङ্ (ŋ) + ढ (ḍʱa) gives the ligature ŋḍʱa:

 ङ্ (ŋ) + ध (dʱa) gives the ligature ŋdʱa:

 ङ্ (ŋ) + ग (ga) gives the ligature ŋga:

 ङ্ (ŋ) + घ (ɡʱa) gives the ligature ŋɡʱa:

 ङ্ (ŋ) + ह (ha) gives the ligature ŋha:

 ङ্ (ŋ) + ज (ja) gives the ligature ŋja:

 ङ্ (ŋ) + झ (jʰa) gives the ligature ŋjʰa:

 ङ্ (ŋ) + ज্ (j) + ञ (ña) gives the ligature ŋjña:

 ङ্ (ŋ) + क (ka) gives the ligature ŋka:

 ङ্ (ŋ) + ख (kʰa) gives the ligature ŋkʰa:

 ङ্ (ŋ) + क্ (k) + rakar र (ra) gives the ligature ŋkra:

 ङ্ (ŋ) + क্ (k) + ष (ṣa) gives the ligature ŋkṣa:

 ङ্ (ŋ) + क্ (k) + ष্ (ṣ) + य (ya) gives the ligature ŋkṣya:

 ङ্ (ŋ) + क্ (k) + त (ta) gives the ligature ŋkta:

 ङ্ (ŋ) + ल (la) gives the ligature ŋla:

 ङ্ (ŋ) + ळ (ḷa) gives the ligature ŋḷa:

 ङ্ (ŋ) + म (ma) gives the ligature ŋma:

 ङ্ (ŋ) + न (na) gives the ligature ŋna:

 ङ্ (ŋ) + ङ (ŋa) gives the ligature ŋŋa:

 ङ্ (ŋ) + ण (ṇa) gives the ligature ŋṇa:

 ङ্ (ŋ) + ञ (ña) gives the ligature ŋña:

 ङ্ (ŋ) + प (pa) gives the ligature ŋpa:

 ङ্ (ŋ) + फ (pʰa) gives the ligature ŋpʰa:

 ङ্ (ŋ) + स (sa) gives the ligature ŋsa:

 ङ্ (ŋ) + श (ʃa) gives the ligature ŋʃa:

 ङ্ (ŋ) + ष (ṣa) gives the ligature ŋṣa:

 ङ্ (ŋ) + त (ta) gives the ligature ŋta:

 ङ্ (ŋ) + थ (tʰa) gives the ligature ŋtʰa:

 ङ্ (ŋ) + ट (ṭa) gives the ligature ŋṭa:

 ङ্ (ŋ) + ठ (ṭʰa) gives the ligature ŋṭʰa:

 ङ্ (ŋ) + व (va) gives the ligature ŋva:

 फ্ (pʰ) + ङ (ŋa) gives the ligature pʰŋa:

 प্ (p) + ङ (ŋa) gives the ligature pŋa:

 Repha र্ (r) + ङ্ (ŋ) + ग (ga) gives the ligature rŋga:

 ष্ (ṣ) + ङ (ŋa) gives the ligature ṣŋa:

 थ্ (tʰ) + ङ (ŋa) gives the ligature tʰŋa:

 ठ্ (ṭʰ) + ङ (ŋa) gives the ligature ṭʰŋa:

 ट্ (ṭ) + ङ (ŋa) gives the ligature ṭŋa:

 व্ (v) + ङ (ŋa) gives the ligature vŋa:

 य্ (y) + ङ (ŋa) gives the ligature yŋa:

Bengali script
The Bengali script ঙ is derived from the Siddhaṃ , and has no horizontal head line, and a less geometric shape than its Devanagari counterpart, ङ. The inherent vowel of Bengali consonant letters is /ɔ/, so the bare letter ঙ will sometimes be transliterated as "ngo" instead of "nga". Adding okar, the "o" vowel mark, gives a reading of /ŋo/.
Like all Indic consonants, ঙ can be modified by marks to indicate another (or no) vowel than its inherent "a".

ঙ in Bengali-using languages
ঙ is used as a basic consonant character in all of the major Bengali script orthographies, including Bengali and Assamese.

Conjuncts with ঙ
Bengali ঙ exhibits conjunct ligatures, as is common in Indic scripts, with both stacked and unstacked ligatures being common.
 ঙ্ (ŋ) + গ (ga) gives the ligature ŋga:

 ঙ্ (ŋ) + ঘ (ɡʱa) gives the ligature ŋɡʱa:

 ঙ্ (ŋ) + ঘ্ (ɡʱ) + র (ra) gives the ligature ŋɡʱra, with the ra phala suffix:

 ঙ্ (ŋ) + ঘ্ (ɡʱ) + য (ya) gives the ligature ŋɡʱya, with the ya phala suffix:

 ঙ্ (ŋ) + গ্ (g) + য (ya) gives the ligature ŋgya, with the ya phala suffix:

 ঙ্ (ŋ) + ক (ka) gives the ligature ŋka:

 ঙ্ (ŋ) + খ (kʰa) gives the ligature ŋkʰa:

 ঙ্ (ŋ) + ক্ (k) + র (ra) gives the ligature ŋkra, with the ra phala suffix:

 ঙ্ (ŋ) + ক্ (k) + শ (ʃa) gives the ligature ŋkʃa:

 ঙ্ (ŋ) + ক্ (k) + য (ya) gives the ligature ŋkya, with the ya phala suffix:

 ঙ্ (ŋ) + ম (ma) gives the ligature ŋma:

Gujarati Ṅa

Ṅa (ઙ) is the fifth consonant of the Gujarati abugida. It is derived from the 16th century Devanagari Ṅa  with the top bar (shirorekha) removed, and ultimately from the Brahmi letter .

Gujarati-using Languages
The Gujarati script is used to write the Gujarati and Kutchi languages. Like all Indic scripts, Gujarati uses vowel marks attached to the base consonant to override the inherent /ə/ vowel:

Conjuncts with ઙ
Gujarati ઙ exhibits conjunct ligatures, much like its parent Devanagari Script. While most Gujarati conjuncts can only be formed by reducing the letter shape to create a "half form" that fits tightly to following letter, Ṅa does not have a half form. A few conjunct clusters can be represented by a true ligature, instead of a shape that can be broken into constituent independent letters, and vertically stacked conjuncts can also be found in Gujarati, although much less commonly than in Devanagari. Lacking a half form, Ṅa will normally use an explicit virama when forming conjuncts without a true ligature.
True ligatures are quite rare in Indic scripts. The most common ligated conjuncts in Gujarati are in the form of a slight mutation to fit in context or as a consistent variant form appended to the adjacent characters. Those variants include Na and the Repha and Rakar forms of Ra.
 ર્ (r) + ઙ (ŋa) gives the ligature RṄa:

 ઙ્ (ŋ) + ર (ra) gives the ligature ṄRa:

 ઙ્ (ŋ) + ક (ka) gives the ligature ṄKa:

 ઙ્ (ŋ) + ક (ka) ષ (ʂa) gives the ligature ṄKṢa:

Gurmukhi script 
Ṅaṅā   (ਙ) is the tenth letter of the Gurmukhi alphabet. Its name is [ŋɑŋːɑ̃] and is pronounced as /ŋ/ when used in words. It is derived from the Laṇḍā letter ṅa, and ultimately from the Brahmi ṅa. Gurmukhi ṅaṅā does not have a special pairin or addha (reduced) form for making conjuncts, and in modern Punjabi texts do not take a half form or halant to indicate the bare consonant /ŋ/, although Gurmukhi Sanskrit texts may use an explicit halant. Ṅaṅā is rarely used. It cannot begin a syllable or be placed between two consonants, and occurs most often as an allophone of /n/ before specific consonant phonemes.

Burmese script
Nga(င) is the fifth letter of the Burmese script.

Thai script 
Ngo ngu (ง) is the seventh letter of the Thai script. It falls under the low class of Thai consonants. In IPA, ngo ngu is pronounced as [ŋ] at the beginning of a syllable and at the end of a syllable. Unlike many Indic scripts, Thai consonants do not form conjunct ligatures, and use the pinthu—an explicit virama with a dot shape—to indicate bare consonants. In the acrophony of the Thai script, ngu (งู) means ‘snake’. Ngo ngu corresponds to the Sanskrit character ‘ङ’.

Javanese script

Telugu Ṅa

Ṅa (ఙ) is a consonant of the Telugu abugida. It ultimately arose from the Brahmi letter . It is closely related to the Kannada letter ಙ. Since it lacks the v-shaped headstroke common to most Telugu letters, ఙ remains unaltered by most vowel matras, and its subjoined form is simply a smaller version of the normal letter shape.
Telugu conjuncts are created by reducing trailing letters to a subjoined form that appears below the initial consonant of the conjunct. Many subjoined forms are created by dropping their headline, with many extending the end of the stroke of the main letter body to form an extended tail reaching up to the right of the preceding consonant. This subjoining of trailing letters to create conjuncts is in contrast to the leading half forms of Devanagari and Bengali letters. Ligature conjuncts are not a feature in Telugu, with the only non-standard construction being an alternate subjoined form of Ṣa (borrowed from Kannada) in the KṢa conjunct.

Malayalam Ṅa

Ṅa (ങ) is a consonant of the Malayalam abugida. It ultimately arose from the Brahmi letter , via the Grantha letter  Nga. Like in other Indic scripts, Malayalam consonants have the inherent vowel "a", and take one of several modifying vowel signs to represent syllables with another vowel or no vowel at all.

Conjuncts of ങ
As is common in Indic scripts, Malayalam joins letters together to form conjunct consonant clusters. There are several ways in which conjuncts are formed in Malayalam texts: using a post-base form of a trailing consonant placed under the initial consonant of a conjunct, a combined ligature of two or more consonants joined together, a conjoining form that appears as a combining mark on the rest of the conjunct, the use of an explicit candrakkala mark to suppress the inherent "a" vowel, or a special consonant form called a "chillu" letter, representing a bare consonant without the inherent "a" vowel. Texts written with the modern reformed Malayalam orthography, put̪iya lipi, may favor more regular conjunct forms than older texts in paḻaya lipi, due to changes undertaken in the 1970s by the Government of Kerala.
 ങ് (ŋ) + ക (ka) gives the ligature ŋka:

 ങ് (ŋ) + ങ (ŋa) gives the ligature ŋŋa:

Odia Ṅa

Ṅa (ଙ) is a consonant of the Odia abugida. It ultimately arose from the Brahmi letter , via the Siddhaṃ letter  Nga. Like in other Indic scripts, Odia consonants have the inherent vowel "a", and take one of several modifying vowel signs to represent syllables with another vowel or no vowel at all.

Conjuncts of ଙ 
As is common in Indic scripts, Odia joins letters together to form conjunct consonant clusters. The most common conjunct formation is achieved by using a small subjoined form of trailing consonants. Most consonants' subjoined forms are identical to the full form, just reduced in size, although a few drop the curved headline or have a subjoined form not directly related to the full form of the consonant. The second type of conjunct formation is through pure ligatures, where the constituent consonants are written together in a single graphic form. This ligature may be recognizable as being a combination of two characters or it can have a conjunct ligature unrelated to its constituent characters.
 ଙ୍ (ŋ) + କ (ka) gives the ligature ŋka:

 ଙ୍ (ŋ) + ଖ (kʰa) gives the ligature ŋkʰa:

 ଙ୍ (ŋ) + ଗ (ga) gives the ligature ŋga:

 ଙ୍ (ŋ) + ଘ (ɡʱa) gives the ligature ŋɡʱa:

 ର୍ (r) + ଙ (ŋa) gives the ligature rŋa:

 ଙ୍ (ŋ) + ର (ra) gives the ligature ŋra:

Comparison of Ṅa
The various Indic scripts are generally related to each other through adaptation and borrowing, and as such the glyphs for cognate letters, including Ṅa, are related as well.

Character encodings of Ṅa
Most Indic scripts are encoded in the Unicode Standard, and as such the letter Ṅa in those scripts can be represented in plain text with unique codepoint. Ṅa from several modern-use scripts can also be found in legacy encodings, such as ISCII.

References

 Kurt Elfering: Die Mathematik des Aryabhata I. Text, Übersetzung aus dem Sanskrit und Kommentar. Wilhelm Fink Verlag, München, 1975, 
 Georges Ifrah: The Universal History of Numbers. From Prehistory to the Invention of the Computer. John Wiley & Sons, New York, 2000, .
 B. L. van der Waerden: Erwachende Wissenschaft. Ägyptische, babylonische und griechische Mathematik. Birkhäuser-Verlag, Basel Stuttgart, 1966, 
 
 
 Conjuncts are identified by IAST transliteration, except aspirated consonants are indicated with a superscript "h" to distinguish from an unaspirated cononant + Ha, and the use of the IPA "ŋ" and "ʃ" instead of the less dinstinctive "ṅ" and "ś".

Indic letters